Cate West: The Vanishing Files is a mystery game created and developed by Gamenauts and published by Real Arcade for Windows.

The game was subsequently ported to the Nintendo DS and Wii platforms by Destineer. Oxygen Interactive Software distributed the Wii and DS versions for the European regions.

Players take control of Cate West, a crime novelist plagued by psychic visions, who has been approached by the police to help solve a series of "unsolvable" cases, dubbed "The Vanishing Files".

Reception

Cate West: The Vanishing Files received mixed reviews from critics upon release. On Metacritic, the game holds scores of 68/100 for the DS version based on 4 reviews, and 65/100 for the Wii version based on 8 reviews. On GameRankings, the game holds scores of 67.00% for the DS version based on 4 reviews, and 66.63% for the Wii version based on 8 reviews.

References

External links 
 Official Cate West website (Archived)
 Game info on MobyGames

2008 video games
Adventure games
Nintendo DS games
Wii games
Windows games
Hidden object games
Video games developed in the United States
Video games featuring female protagonists
Oxygen Games games
Multiplayer and single-player video games